Alois Vogl (born 15 September 1972 in Neukirchen beim Heiligen Blut) is a retired German alpine skier.

He represented Germany at the 2006 Winter Olympics. He also has one victory in the World Cup, 2005 slalom in Wengen.

References

1972 births
Living people
German male alpine skiers
Alpine skiers at the 2006 Winter Olympics
Olympic alpine skiers of Germany
21st-century German people